Bochorna is a highland village in Akhmeta Municipality, northeast Georgia. Bochorna had a permanent resident population of only one man at the time of the 2014 national census.

Geography 
According to the traditional subdivision of Georgia, the village is included in the Chaghma community of the province of Tusheti, part of the modern-day region (mkhare) of Kakheti and home to the Tush subgroup of Georgians, who have historically been involved in transhumant lifestyle of sheep farming. The environs are part of the Tusheti National Park.

History 
Bochorna, then known as Bochorma (ბოჭორმა), like many other highland hamlets in Tusheti, was an abandoned settlement at the time of the 2002 census, but was reported resettled—by one elderly man continuously and a few others in summer months—in the next national census of 2014. Thus, the government of Georgia restored the locale to a village status and announced it to be the "highest permanently inhabited place in Europe," a status hitherto claimed by the northwestern Georgian village of Ushguli.

References 

Populated places in Kakheti